Naregal is a big village in Haveri district Karnataka, India with a population of over 7,000. It is in Hangal Taluk. The village is an agricultural village and is known for the production of coconut, Maize, and jawar.

Cities and towns in Haveri district